Jawahar Setu is across the Son River, between Dehri-on-Son and Son Nagar,  in the Indian state of Bihar. It is named after the first prime minister of India, Jawaharlal Nehru. It was designed and completed in 1963 by principal engineer Shantaram S. Kashyap. 

The    road bridge carries the Grand Trunk Road/ NH 2.  It was built by Gammon India Ltd in 1963-65.

Nehru Setu, the rail bridge that runs parallel to the road bridge was built in 1900.

See also
List of longest bridges in the world
List of longest bridges above water in India

References
 

Bridges in Bihar
Rohtas district
Road bridges in India
Monuments and memorials to Jawaharlal Nehru
Bridges over the Son River
Dehri